The Frenchgate Interchange (also known as Doncaster Interchange) is a rail and bus transport interchange located within the Frenchgate Shopping Centre in the city centre of Doncaster, South Yorkshire, England. It has 30 bus stands, with a large number of destinations accessible from Doncaster railway station.

History 
Frenchgate Interchange was designed by local transport executive South Yorkshire Passenger Transport Executive (SYPTE) and shopping centre owners Teesland. It had received planning permission by 2001, and was intended to open in 2004 at a cost of £70 million.

Work began in 2003. It opened in June 2006 and became the city's main transport hub, with SYPTE predicting that it would receive around 12 million passengers per year. The previous Doncaster North and Doncaster South bus stations, which dated from the 1960s and were located underneath multi-storey car parks, were closed. However, the South Bus Station remained a multi storey car park and has recently become the main car park for the developing civic area.

Services 
, the stand allocation is:

References

External links
 Real time departures at Frenchgate Interchange
 Doncaster Interchange Spider Map (August 2010) Travel South Yorkshire
 Doncaster Interchange Fabsec.co.uk

Bus stations in South Yorkshire
Transport infrastructure completed in 2006
Transport in Doncaster
2006 establishments in England